Ruth Humbel (born 23 July 1957) is a Swiss politician (CVP) and a member of the Federal Assembly. She is also an orienteering competitor at international level. She won bronze medals in the relay at the World Orienteering Championships in 1978, 1981 and 1985. She placed fourth in the individual event at the 1981 World Championships, and fifth in the relay in 1979.

Personal life
Humbel lives in the municipality of Birmenstorf in the canton Aargau in Switzerland. She is married to historian Beat Näf, and has two children, born in 1991 and 1994.

Sports career
Humbel was five times individual Swiss Champion in Orienteering. She was part of the Swiss national team from 1975 to 1987, and competed in seven World Orienteering Championships.

At the 1976 World Orienteering Championships in Aviemore she placed 19th in the classic distance. The 1978 World Championships were held in Kongsberg, Norway. Humbel started both in the individual competition, where she placed 13th, and in the relay. The Swiss team earned a bronze medal, behind Finland and Sweden, in a close finish two seconds ahead of the Norway team. Also on the Swiss team were Ruth Baumberger and Hanni Fries. In Tampere in 1979 she placed 25th in the individual competition, and fifth with the Swiss team, which consisted of Annelies Meier, Humbel and Fries. In 1981 the World Championships were held in Thun, in her home country. Humbel achieved her best individual result, placing fourth. In the relay Switzerland won the bronze medal, behind Sweden and Finland. On the Swiss team were Ruth Schmid, Annelies Meier Irene Bucher and Humbel. In Zalaegerszeg in 1983 she placed 31st in the individual course, and fifth in the relay. In Bendigo in 1985 she placed 28th in the individual course, and the Swiss team won a bronze medal in the relay. Her last appearance at the World Orienteering Championships was in Gerardmer in 1987. She placed 18th in the individual competition, and sixth in the relay.

Political career
Humbel was a member of the Aargau Parliament from 1981 to 2003. In 2003 she was elected to the National Council of Switzerland, and reelected in 2007. She represents the canton Aargau, and the Christian Democratic People's Party of Switzerland.

References

External links
 Ruth Humbel on the website of the Federal Assembly of Switzerland
 

Swiss orienteers
Members of the National Council (Switzerland)
1957 births
Living people
Female orienteers
Foot orienteers
Women members of the National Council (Switzerland)
World Orienteering Championships medalists
20th-century Swiss women politicians
20th-century Swiss politicians
21st-century Swiss women politicians
21st-century Swiss politicians